The 2019–20 Weber State Wildcats men's basketball team represented Weber State University in the 2019–20 NCAA Division I men's basketball season. The Wildcats, led by 14th-year head coach Randy Rahe, played their home games at the Dee Events Center in Ogden, Utah, as members of the Big Sky Conference. They finished the season 12–20, 8–12 in Big Sky play to finish in a tie for eighth place. As the No. 9 seed in the Big Sky tournament, they lost in the first round to Sacramento State.

Previous season
The Wildcats finished the 2018–19 season 18–15, 11–9 in Big Sky play to finish in a three-way tie for fourth place. In the Big Sky tournament, they defeated Portland State in the quarterfinals, before falling to top-seeded Montana in the semifinals.

Roster

Schedule and results

|-
!colspan=12 style=| Exhibition

|-
!colspan=12 style=| Non-conference regular season

|-
!colspan=12 style=| Big Sky regular season

|-
!colspan=12 style=| Big Sky tournament
|-

|-

Source

References

Weber State Wildcats men's basketball seasons
Weber State Wildcats
Weber State Wildcats men's basketball
Weber State Wildcats men's basketball